Anthony William Hernández González (born 11 October 2001) is a Costa Rican professional footballer for Puntarenas F.C. in Liga FPD, the Costa Rican top division, and the Costa Rica national football team.

Career
Hernández started playing for Puntarenas in 2020. In May 2022, Puntarenas beat Carmelita 3-0 on aggregate to earn promotion from Segunda División de Costa Rica to Costa Rica’s top flight for the first time since 2014. Hernández made his debut in the top flight on 20 July 2022 as his side won 3-0 against A.D. San Carlos. He scored his first professional goal on 11 August 2022, in a 3-1 win against Municipal Grecia.

International career
Born in Costa Rica, Hernández is of Jamaican descent. On 23 August 2022 he made his debut for the Costa Rica national football team against South Korea, coming on in the 65th minute for Jewison Bennette in a 2–2 draw. Hernández scored his first goal for Costa Rica on 27 September 2022 against Uzbekistan. He was named in the Costa Rica squad for the 2022 FIFA World Cup.

International goals

References

External links

2001 births
Living people
Costa Rican footballers
Costa Rica international footballers
Costa Rican people of Jamaican descent
2022 FIFA World Cup players
Puntarenas F.C. players